Holme railway station served Holme Chapel on the Copy Pit line. The station closed in July 1930 and the line now serves as a non-stop route between Hebden Bridge and Burnley.

References

External links
Holme Station on navigable 1947 O.S. map

Disused railway stations in Burnley
Former Lancashire and Yorkshire Railway stations
Railway stations in Great Britain opened in 1849
Railway stations in Great Britain closed in 1930
1849 establishments in England